Gun Island is one of the larger islands in the Pelsaert Group of the Houtman Abrolhos, in the Indian Ocean off the west coast of Australia. The island is part of the Houtman Abrolhos Important Bird Area, identified as such by BirdLife International because of its importance for supporting large numbers of breeding seabirds.

History
Between June 1727 and March 1728, crew of the Dutch VOC ship  were stranded on the island after it struck Half Moon Reef. A longboat with 11 seamen was dispatched to go for help, but it failed to return, and the remaining survivors used wreckage to construct a  sloop, which they named the Sloepie. Of the 88 crew who survived, 82 arrived in Batavia on 30 April 1728.

During Admiralty surveys of the north-west coast in 1840, the crew of  discovered a brass gun of about three pounds calibre and an iron swivel gun on which paint was still adhered. Captain Stokes, with Commander John Clements Wickham, named the place Gun Island. They also discovered several coins, including one dated about 1707 and another dated 1720. Also seen was what appeared to be the beam of a ship with an iron bolt through it, and glass bottles and clay pipes. The material was presumed to have been left there by the Zeewyk castaways 112 years earlier.

In 1883, Charles Edward Broadhurst, who had been granted a lease for guano export, discovered several campsites, as well as the bones of seals which had evidently been killed for sustenance by the crew of the Zeewyk.

Gun Island was one of the islands of the Abrolhos most heavily worked for guano. Guano workings continued on a commercial scale from the 1880s to the 1920s, and again in the mid-1940s. A  stone jetty on the south-eastern corner, built for loading guano, remains intact.

The yacht Nautilus was wrecked at Gun Island in 1897.

From June to November 1968, a stratigraphic test well was drilled on Gun Island (28º53'30.11"S, 113º51'27.0"E) by BP Petroleum Development Australia. The extent of the drilling platform near the wharf can be seen on satellite images.

Archaeology
In 1974, an archaeological expedition was made to the island by members of the Western Australian Museum.

Gun Island is classified as having "High" conservation significance and is one of the seven protected zones in the Abrolhos Islands. Protected zone restrictions mean that "visitors shall not carry out any digging or major earthworks within the zones around declared maritime archaeological sites unless permitted to do so", and that they shall also not take metal detecting devices onto the island.

References

Pelsaert Group
Important Bird Areas of Western Australia